The Uganda national rugby union team are a national sporting side of Uganda, representing them at rugby union. Rugby union was introduced by the British during colonial rule and Uganda played their first international game against Kenya in 1958. They have not yet qualified for the Rugby World Cup.

Uganda compete annually against Kenya in the Elgon Cup and the Africa Cup. The Rugby Cranes won the CAR in 2007.

History

Uganda has a long history of rugby participation dating back to even before the first official rugby match was ever played in 1958. The Uganda Rugby Football Union (URFU) as it was known then was formed in 1955. There were no clubs formed at the time and games were frequently played between representative sides from Kenya and Tanganyika (Tanzania at the time) but most notably against the Royal Navy and some British and South African Universities.

In the early 1930s there was only one rugby club in Uganda called the "Uganda Rugby Football Club", which later became "Uganda Kobs Rugby Football Club" and then its name was changed to "Kampala Kobs Rugby Football Club". Most rugby games were played in Entebbe.

The East Africa team played some of the best sides in the world, including the British Lions in 1955, South Africa in 1961, and Wales in 1964. The three African Great Lakes countries of Kenya, Tanzania and Uganda have a long shared history of rugby. For much of their history, they have relied on each other for club, inter-district, inter-territorial and international matches, as well as combining their resources to create a regional squad called "the Tuskers".

The three East African countries, at the time, each had membership in the Rugby Football Union of East Africa (RFUEA), an umbrella union for the three nations both before and after they each achieved independence in the early 1960s. Until independence, each was regarded as a colonial possession of the British Empire rather than an independent nation.

The first official match between Uganda and Kenya took place in 1958 played in Kampala a game Uganda lost; Uganda scoring 11 points to 21 for Kenya. Uganda Rugby Union formally Uganda Rugby Football Union, become a World Rugby formally International Rugby Board affiliate in 1997 and now has a total rugby playing population of approximately 22,000.

With the formation of the Confederation of African Rugby in the year 2000, the Ugandan Rugby Union also became automatic full members. Uganda's biggest winning margin was to come in 2003 when Uganda beat Burundi 100-0. Uganda would later post its worst defeat in 2005 against South Africa; Uganda scored 10 points to 98 for South Africa XV.

World Cup record

Current squad

Uganda 2022 Africa Cup squad

Akera Komaketch, Joseph Aredo, Arthur Mpande, Asuman Mugerwa. Aziku Robert, Tawfik Bagalana, Chissano Joachim, Emmanuel Ecodu, Emong Eliphaz, Paul Epilo ,Thomas Gwokto, Juuko Jude, Kanyanya Ronald, Kato Reynolds, Khani Aziziz, Colin Kimbowa, Ivan Kirabo, Saul Kivumbi , Ivan Magomu (Captain), Manano Alhaji, James Mugisha, Jacob Ochen, Uhuru Charles, Timothy Oodongo, Faragi Odugo, Pius Ogena, Okia Solomon, George Scott Olwuoch ,Michael Otto, Joseph Oyet, Alema Ruhweza , Lawrence Ssebuliba ,Santos Ssenteza, Wanyama Conrad, Philip Wokorach

Recent results
For the 2017 series, the Africa Cup fixture between Kenya and Uganda will double up as the second leg of the Elgon Cup.

2017 Results

Africa Cup

See also
 East Africa rugby union team
 Uganda national rugby sevens team
 Rugby union in Uganda
 Elgon Cup

References

External links
Uganda Rugby Union Official Site

 
African national rugby union teams
Rugby union in Uganda